Calcium ascorbate is a compound with the molecular formula CaC12H14O12. It is the calcium salt of ascorbic acid, one of the mineral ascorbates. It is approximately 10% calcium by mass.

As a food additive, it has the E number E 302. It is approved for use as a food in the EU, USA and Australia and New Zealand.

References 

Ascorbates
Calcium compounds
Vitamers
Vitamin C
E-number additives